Gavin Horsburgh (born 26 August 1997) is a Scottish and British rower.

Rowing career
Horsburgh from Lochwinnoch, Scotland, won a gold medal at the 2015 World Rowing Junior Championships in Rio de Janeiro and in the quadruple sculls at the World Rowing U23 Championships. He won a silver medal at the 2017 World Rowing Championships in Sarasota, Florida, as part of the lightweight quadruple sculls with Edward Fisher, Zak Lee-Green and Peter Chambers. He won a double sculls and quad sculls bronze at the 2018 British Rowing Senior Championships in Nottingham.

References

Living people
1997 births
British male rowers
Scottish male rowers
World Rowing Championships medalists for Great Britain